Chariton is an unincorporated community in northeast Putnam County, in the U.S. state of Missouri.

The community is on Missouri Route DD two miles east of Missouri Route 149. The Missouri-Iowa border is one mile north of the community. Unionville is approximately 15 miles to the southwest.

History
A post office called Chariton was established in 1883, and remained in operation until 1907. The community takes its name from the nearby Chariton River.

References

Unincorporated communities in Putnam County, Missouri
Unincorporated communities in Missouri